WDEL (1150 kHz) is a commercial AM radio station in Wilmington, Delaware, airing a news/talk radio format. Its programming is simulcast on co-owned station 101.7 WDEL-FM. WDEL broadcasts at 5,000 watts using a directional antenna, with its transmitter, studios and offices located on Shipley Road in Wilmington.

As of May 20, 2019, WDEL is owned by Forever Media. Previously, it had been owned for more than 80 years by Delmarva Broadcasting Company, a subsidiary of Steinman Enterprises, a family-owned newspaper, broadcasting and mining company, based in Lancaster, Pennsylvania.

Programming and Sports
On weekdays, WDEL-AM-FM airs local talk and information shows from 6 a.m. to 7 p.m. After 7 o'clock, it carries nationally syndicated talk shows, including Dave Ramsey, Jim Bohannon, Red Eye Radio and America in the Morning. On weekends, WDEL-AM-FM airs shows devoted to money, sports, real estate, home repair, gardening and religion, including some paid brokered programming. Syndicated programming on weekends includes Clark Howard, Ric Edelman and Motley Fool. World and national news is supplied by CBS News Radio.

WDEL-AM-FM carries Philadelphia Phillies baseball, Philadelphia Eagles football, plus other local and national sports. WDEL-AM-FM airs Wesley College football and numerous New Castle County high school football and basketball games. On weekends, WDEL-AM-FM also carries some sports programming from the SportsMap Radio Network.

History

WDEL was first licensed in July 1922 to the Wilmington Electrical Specialty Company, and was initially issued the sequentially assigned call letters WHAV. It made its debut broadcast on July 22 as one of the earliest broadcasting stations licensed in the United States, and the first in the state of Delaware. In 1926 the call letters were changed to WDEL. Founded by Willard S. Wilson, the station was originally only powered at 250 watts, but by the late 1940s, it had been granted an increase to its current power of 5,000 watts.

During the Golden Age of Radio, WDEL was an NBC Red Network affiliate, carrying its dramas, comedies, sports, news, game shows, soap operas and big band broadcasts. For a time in the 1940s, WDEL was co-owned with another early AM station licensed to Wilmington, WILM. While WDEL carried NBC Red Network programs, WILM aired shows from the NBC Blue Network (later ABC) and the Mutual Broadcasting System.

In 1949, WDEL signed on a TV station, Channel 7 WDEL-TV.  Because WDEL had been a long-time NBC radio affiliate, WDEL-TV became an NBC-TV network affiliate. It also carried programming from the DuMont Television Network. But it was limited in power due to its proximity to two other Channel 7 stations in New York City and Washington, DC. It later moved to Channel 12. The Steinman Family sold Channel 12 in 1955 and it eventually became WHYY-TV, the PBS station for Philadelphia, but still licensed to Wilmington.

In 1950, WDEL added an FM station, 93.7 WDEL-FM.  At first it simulcast the programming on the AM station. But by the late 1960s, it aired separate programming using the call sign WSTW.

With the demise of old time network radio in the 1950s, WDEL adopted a full-service format, combining news, sports and middle of the road music.

In the mid-1980s, WDEL was the first Wilmington radio station to provide traffic reports. WDEL's "TrafficWatch on the 9s" remains on the air today.

In the mid-1990s, WDEL moved to a news/talk format, eliminating music. The station aired a local call-in and information show in the morning, plus various nationally syndicated programs during the day including Dr. Laura, Rush Limbaugh, Mitch Albom and Sean Hannity.

In 2006, WDEL's main competitor, AM 1450 WILM, was bought by Clear Channel Communications (now iHeartMedia, Inc.). Because Limbaugh and Hannity are syndicated by Premiere Networks, an iHeart subsidiary, those shows moved over to WILM. As a result, WDEL adopted a weekday schedule of mostly live and local news and talk, only running syndicated programming in the evening and on weekends.

In 2015, Delmarva Broadcasting acquired 101.7 WJKS, licensed to Canton, New Jersey, but with a signal that covers parts of Northern Delaware, including sections of Wilmington. On April 1, WJKS flipped from urban adult contemporary music to a simulcast of 1150 WDEL, giving the station's listeners the option to hear it on AM or FM. The call letters were switched to WDEL-FM, returning that call sign to the air on 101.7 MHz. (For much of the 1950s and 60s, the WDEL-FM call letters were used on co-owned 93.7 MHz, which now is WSTW.)

In early 2019, it was announced that Steinman Communications was selling all Delmarva Broadcasting stations to Forever Media.  The deal closed on May 20, 2019.

Awards
WDEL has won several prestigious Edward R. Murrow Awards from the Radio Television Digital News Association, including national awards in 2007 for Best Website and 2009 for Best Newscast. WDEL has also been named News Operation of the Year by the Chesapeake Associated Press Broadcasters Association numerous times.

In 2004, WDEL was awarded by the National Association of Broadcasters with its prestigious Crystal Award for public service.

In 2005, WDEL became one of the first radio stations in the nation to produce web-based news video for its website, WDEL.com.

In 2011, WDEL won a prestigious Marconi Award from the National Association of Broadcasters for "Medium Market Station of the Year."

In 2014, WDEL's news department won the RTDNA national Edward R. Murrow Award for "Overall Excellence."  WDEL also won RTDNA's national Murrow Award for "Best Newscast" that year. In 2016, WDEL again won the Murrow Award for "Overall Excellence."

Simulcast
One FM station simulcasts the programming of WDEL:

See also
 WDEL-FM

References

External links

FCC History Cards for WDEL

DEL
Radio stations established in 1922
Wilmington, Delaware
News and talk radio stations in the United States
1922 establishments in Delaware
Radio stations licensed before 1923 and still broadcasting